This is a list of Bulgarian football transfers for the 2012–13 winter transfer window. Only transfers involving a team from the A PFG and B PFG are listed. The window is closed at midnight on 28 February 2013. Players without a club may join one at any time, either during or in between transfer windows.

A PFG

Beroe

In:

Out:

Botev Plovdiv

In:

Out:

Botev Vratsa

In:

Out:

Cherno More

In:

Out:

Chernomorets Burgas

In:

Out:

CSKA Sofia

In:
 
 

Out:

Etar 1924

In:

Out:

Levski Sofia

In:

 

Out:

Litex Lovech

In:

Out:

Lokomotiv Plovdiv

In:

Out:

Lokomotiv Sofia

In:

Out:

Ludogorets Razgrad

In:

Out:

Minyor Pernik

In:

Out:

Montana

In:

Out:

Pirin Gotse Delchev

In:

Out:

Slavia Sofia

In:

Out:

B PFG

Bansko

In:

Out:

Chavdar Etropole

In:

Out:

Kaliakra

In:

Out:

Lyubimets 2007

In:

Out:

Neftochimic Burgas

In:

Out:

Pirin Razlog

In:

Out:

Rakovski 2011

In:

Out:

Septemvri Simitli

In:

Out:

Shumen 2010

In:

Out:

Spartak Pleven

In:

Out:

Spartak Varna

In:

Out:

Sliven 2000

In:

Out:

Svetkavitsa

In:

Out:

Vidima-Rakovski

In:

Out:

References

Bulgaria
Winter 2012-13